Schlotheim is a town and a former municipality in the Unstrut-Hainich-Kreis district, in Thuringia, Germany. Since December 2019, it is part of the town Nottertal-Heilinger Höhen.

Notable residents

Werner Braune (1909–1951), German Nazi SS officer, executed for war crimes
Carlos Hartling (born in 1869) German musician author of the music of the National Anthem of Honduras.

References

Unstrut-Hainich-Kreis
Schwarzburg-Rudolstadt
Former municipalities in Thuringia